Flower and Snake may refer to:
 Flower and Snake (1974 film), a Japanese pink film
 Flower and Snake (2004 film), a Japanese film based on the 1974 film
 Flower and Snake: Zero, a 2014 Japanese erotic drama film